A Salute to Ellington is an album by American organist Bill Doggett released by the King label in 1957.

Track listing
 "Caravan" (Juan Tizol, Duke Ellington, Irving Mills) – 2:20
 "Prelude to a Kiss" (Ellington, Irving Gordon, Mills) – 2:34
 "I'm Just a Lucky So and So" (Ellington, Mack David) – 3:50
 "Solitude" (Ellington, Eddie DeLange, Mills) – 3:44
 "I Let a Song Go Out of My Heart" (Ellington, Henry Nemo, John Redmond, Mills) – 2:29
 "Don't Get Around Much Anymore" (Ellington, Bob Russell) – 2:18
 "I Got It Bad and That Ain't Good" (Ellington, Paul Francis Webster) – 5:04
 "Don't You Know I Care" (Ellington, Mack David) – 2:43
 "C Jam Blues" (Ellington) – 2:21
 "Sophisticated Lady" (Ellington, Mitchell Parish, Mills) – 2:49
 "Satin Doll" (Ellington, Billy Strayhorn) – 3:07
 "Perdido" (Tizol, Ellington, Ervin Drake, Hans Lengsfelder) – 2:29

Personnel
Bill Doggett – organ
Clifford Scott – tenor saxophone, alto saxophone, flute
Billy Butler – guitar
Shep Shepherd – drums

References 

King Records (United States) albums
Bill Doggett albums
1957 albums
Duke Ellington tribute albums